This is a list of fictional characters that either self-identify as vegetarian or have been identified by outside parties to be vegetarian. Listed characters are either protagonists and recurring characters. Some scholars have argued that mass media serves as a "source of information for individuals" interested in vegetarianism or veganism, while there are "increasing social sanctions against eating meat." Even so, there are lingering stereotypes of vegans and vegetarians in the same media, with journalist Farhad Manjoo writing in August 2019 that it is "still widely acceptable to make fun of vegans."

The names are organized alphabetically by surname (i.e. last name), or by single name if the character does not have a surname. If more than two characters are in one entry, the last name of the first character is used.

Animation

Comics

Film

Games

Literature

Live-action television

See also
 Go Vegan
 South Asian Veggie Table
 List of vegetarians
 List of vegans
 List of vegetarian and vegan companies
 List of vegetarian festivals
 List of vegetarian restaurants
 Environmental vegetarianism
 Ethics of eating meat

References

External links
 Grant Lingel, Veganism Gets No Respect in the Media and This is Why, Sentient Media, May 9, 2019
 Jack Price-Darbyshire, Feminists and vegans are given an unfair portrayal in the media, Epigram, October 31, 2018
 Anam Alam, Representation of vegans in movies and TV shows, The Vegan Review, July 19, 2020
 Archived Greenpeace International "Fun & games" page

 
Vegetarian-related mass media
Vegetarianism in the United States
Vegetarianism
Vegetarians
Vegetarian